Henry Street Historic District is a national historic district located at Roanoke, Virginia.  It encompasses four contributing buildings constructed between 1917 and 1951.  They were developed as the central business and entertainment district for the African-American neighborhood of Gainsboro in Northwest Roanoke. They are the Hotel Dumas (1917), The Strand Theatre (1923), Dr. Lylburn Downing office (c. 1945), and a commercial building (1951).

It was listed on the National Register of Historic Places in 2004.  The buildings are also included in the Gainsboro Historic District.

References

African-American history of Virginia
Historic districts on the National Register of Historic Places in Virginia
Theatres on the National Register of Historic Places in Virginia
Commercial buildings on the National Register of Historic Places in Virginia
Buildings and structures in Roanoke, Virginia
National Register of Historic Places in Roanoke, Virginia